Tephritis baccharis is a species of fruit fly in the family Tephritidae.

Distribution
USA, Mexico.

References

Tephritinae
Insects described in 1894
Diptera of North America